Kaare Norman Selvig (17 July 1918 – 20 December 2015) was a Norwegian business leader.

He was born in Glasgow as a son of a seamen's priest. He finished his secondary education in 1937, graduated from the University of Oslo with the cand.jur. degree in 1946. He was the managing director of the Norwegian Employers' Confederation between 1969 and 1979. He resided in Sandvika. He was decorated as a Knight, First Class of the Order of St. Olav, Commander of the Order of the Dannebrog, the Order of the White Rose of Finland and the Order of the Polar Star.

References

1918 births
2015 deaths
Norwegian expatriates in the United Kingdom

University of Oslo alumni
Norwegian jurists
Norwegian businesspeople
Commanders of the Order of the Dannebrog
Commanders of the Order of the Polar Star
People from Bærum